Cuper (or Cúper) may refer to:

Cuper's Cove, a 15th-century English settlement in SW Newfoundland, Canada
Cuper's Gardens (also called Cupid's Gardens), a pleasure garden in London, U.K.

People with the name
Héctor Cúper (born 1955), Argentine footballer and manager
Philippe Cuper (born 1957), French clarinetist

See also
Cupper (disambiguation)